Western Town Hall, also known as Liberty Hall, is a historic town hall building located at Westernville in Oneida County, New York. It was built in 1911 and is a two-story, gable roofed timber frame structure.  It was constructed from dismantled components of the ca. 1850 Empire Hotel in Delta.  It was rebuilt as "Liberty Hall," a social gathering hall, and named in honor of General William Floyd.  The second floor has an auditorium.  It has been used as the town hall since 1962.

It was listed on the National Register of Historic Places in 1995.

References

City and town halls on the National Register of Historic Places in New York (state)
Government buildings completed in 1911
Buildings and structures in Oneida County, New York
1911 establishments in New York (state)
National Register of Historic Places in Oneida County, New York